Ahmad Abu Nahyeh (born 7 July 1991) is a Palestinian-Israeli professional footballer who plays as a striker for Jabal Al-Mukaber.

International career

International goals
Scores and results list Palestine's goal tally first.

References

External links 
 
 

1991 births
Living people
Palestinian footballers
Palestine international footballers
Israeli footballers
Association football forwards
Maccabi Umm al-Fahm F.C. players
Bnei Sakhnin F.C. players
Hapoel Ashkelon F.C. players
Maccabi Ahi Nazareth F.C. players
Shabab Al-Khalil SC players
Hilal Al-Quds Club players
Hapoel Iksal F.C. players
Jabal Al-Mukaber Club players
Liga Leumit players
Israeli Premier League players
West Bank Premier League players
Footballers from Umm al-Fahm